Indanthrone blue, also called indanthrene, is an organic compound with the formula .  It is a dark blue solid that is a common dye as well as a precursor to other dyes.

Preparation
The compound made from 2-aminoanthraquinone treated with potassium hydroxide.

Applications
It is a pigment that can be used in the following media: acrylic, alkyd, casein, encaustic, fresco, gouache, linseed oil, tempera, pastel, and watercolor painting. It is used to dye unmordanted cotton and as a pigment in quality paints and enamels. As a food dye, it has E number E130, but it is not approved for use in either the United States or the European Union. It has excellent light fastness, but may bleed in some organic solvents.

Indanthrone blue was the first example of the brand "Indanthren" (an acronym for Indigo from anthracene) introduced by BASF in 1901. One coincidental result is that even now, in Japan vat dyes are commonly described as thren(e) dyes (スレン染料), derived from the Japanese transliteration of the brand.

References

Anthraquinone dyes